Byeon, also known as Byun, Pyon, is a Korean surname. Notable people with the surname include:

 Byeon Chang-heum, South Korean educator
 Byeon Hyo-mun, Joseon diplomat
 Byeon Jin-su, South Korean baseball player
 Byeon Jun-byum, South Korean football player
 Byeon Sang-byeok, Joseon painter
 Byeon Sang-su, South Korean canoeist
 Byeon Sung-wan, South Korean politician
 Byeon Woo-seok, South Korean actor
 Byeon Yeong-ro, South Korean poet
 Byeon Yeong-tae, South Korean politician
 Byun Baek-hyun, South Korean singer and actor, member of boy band Exo
 Byun Byung-joo, South Korean football player
 Byun Chun-sa, South Korean short track speed skater
 Byun Eun-jong, South Korean retired StarCraft pro gamer and poker player
 Byun Hee-bong, South Korean actor
 Byun Ho-young, South Korean football player
 Byun Hye-young, South Korean former swimmer
 Byun Jae-sub, South Korean footballer
 Byun Jang-ho, South Korean film director
 Byun Ji-hyun, South Korean figure skater
 Byun Jung-ilj, former South Korean boxer
 Byun Jung-soo, South Korean model and actress
 Byun Se-jong, South Korean figure skater
 Byun Sung-hwan, South Korean retired footballer
 Byun Woong, South Korean footballer
 Byun Yo-han, South Korean actor
 Byun Young-joo, South Korean film director
 Byun Young-jun, South Korean racewalker
 Pyon In-son, North Korean politician
 Pyon Kwang-sun, North Korean artistic gymnast
 Pyon Rye-yong, North Korean artistic gymnast
 Pyon Yong-rip, North Korean politician

Korean-language surnames